Henry III of Rosenberg (died 28 July 1412) was a Bohemian nobleman who served as Supreme Burgrave of the Kingdom of Bohemia between 1396 and 1398, and between 1400 and 1403. He was a member of the League of Lords and participated in the suppression of King Wenceslas IV in 1394 and 1402.

Henry died in 1412 leaving two children, his nine-year-old son Oldřich II of Rosenberg and his daughter Kateřina. Both were sired with his second wife Eliška of Kravaře. Henry's first son, Peter III of Rosenberg, died in 1406.

In popular culture
Henry was a depicted in the 2022 film Medieval. He was portrayed by Til Schweiger.

References

Further reading

14th-century births
1412 deaths
14th-century Bohemian people
15th-century Bohemian people
Medieval Bohemian nobility
Rosenberg family